Neferitatjanen was the wife of the 12th Dynasty Egyptian king, Amenemhat I and mother of Senwosret I. Her relationships were recorded on a statuette of her son.

She held the title "King's Mother" (mwt-niswt).

Specific dates of birth, marriage and death are not available, but she lived in the 20th century BCE.

See also 
 Women in Ancient Egypt

References

External links
 "A list of Queens of Ancient Egypt - Middle Kingdom"

Queens consort of the Twelfth Dynasty of Egypt
Year of birth unknown
Year of death unknown